Asterios Polyp is a 2009 graphic novel by American cartoonist David Mazzucchelli.

Overview
The title character, Asterios Polyp, is a professor and architect of Greek and Italian descent who teaches at Cornell University in Ithaca, New York. After a lightning strike burns up his apartment, he leaves the city on a Greyhound bus and takes up employment as an auto mechanic in the town of Apogee (somewhere in America, likely Arizona), the farthest point his money will take him. The novel is interspersed with scenes from his past (ostensibly narrated by his stillborn twin brother, Ignazio), including his childhood and troubled marriage, as well as dreams and allegorical sequences. Finally, Asterios must not only confront his own flawed nature, but the implacable and amoral whims of the gods themselves.

Themes

In plot, structure, and design, this book explores the idea of duality. Some of the false dichotomies touched upon are: Apollonian vs. Dionysian; reason vs. emotion; destiny vs. free will; and nature vs. nurture. Ultimately, the book raises questions about how a person becomes who and what he is. Asterios' Greek heritage is one of many allusions to the story of Orpheus and Euridice, a recurring theme throughout the book. It can also be related to the Odyssey, upon which the story is loosely based.

Publication
Asterios Polyp grew out of a story idea that would have filled the entire fourth issue of Rubber Blanket.

It was published as a hardcover, with an architectonic design that alluded to themes of form and function within the text, including a dust jacket shorter than the size of the book that revealed the structure underneath.  Questioned about the impracticality of his design, Mazzucchelli joked that it was "the most frustrating package [I] could come up with".

Reception
The book has sold over 40,000 copies since its publication in July 2009; it is now in its sixth printing.

It won the first Los Angeles Times Book Prize Graphic Novel award.

It received four 2010 Eisner Award nominations and won for best new graphic album, best writer/artist and best lettering. It also won three 2010 Harvey Awards.

References

Notes

Sources

Shaw, Dash. "TCJ 300 Conversations: David Mazzucchelli & Dash Shaw".  The Comics Journal #300.  Fantagraphics Books, December 2009.

External links
 Review in New York Magazine
 Review in The New York Times
 Review in The Austin Chronicle
McCloud, Scott (July 17, 2009). "Some Thoughts on Asterios Polyp". scottmccloud.com 

 (Video) Mazzucchelli talks about Asterios Polyp

2009 graphic novels
2009 comics debuts
Pantheon Books graphic novels